Wilfried Hartung (born 16 August 1953) is a retired German swimmer. Born in East Berlin, East Germany, he competed at the 1972 and 1976 Summer Olympics and won a bronze medal in the 4 × 100 m freestyle relay in 1972. He is the divorced husband of two-time silver Olympic swimmer Gabriele Wetzko.

European championships
At the 1970 European Aquatics Championships he finished in sixth place in the 400 m freestyle. The East German 4×200 m freestyle relay team, of which he was part, won the bronze medal. At the 1974 European Aquatics Championships his team won a bronze medal in the 4×100 m freestyle relay.

Summer Olympics
In 1972 he competed in the 100 m, 200 m, 4×100 m and 4×200 m freestyle events. His team won a bronze medal in the 4×100 m relay. In 1976 he was part of the East German 4×200 m freestyle team that was placed fifth.

World championships
At the 1973 FINA World Aquatics Championships, Hartung competed in the 4×200 m freestyle relay and finished in fourth place. In 1975, he was part of two relay teams: 4 × 100 m, in which East Germany got sixth place, and 4 × 200 m, in which his team finished fifth.

References

External links
 

1953 births
Living people
German male swimmers
Olympic swimmers of East Germany
Swimmers at the 1972 Summer Olympics
Swimmers at the 1976 Summer Olympics
Olympic bronze medalists for East Germany
Olympic bronze medalists in swimming
German male freestyle swimmers
Swimmers from Berlin
European Aquatics Championships medalists in swimming
Medalists at the 1972 Summer Olympics
20th-century German people
21st-century German people